Lewis Pope (died 1623) was an English merchant and politician who sat in the House of Commons from 1621 to 1622.

Pope was  a merchant of Taunton in 1605 when named on a charter of the Spanish Company. In 1621, he was elected Member of Parliament for Taunton. 
 
Pope died between June and December 1623.

Pope married firstly Eleanor Saunders daughter of Christopher Saunders of Taunton, but she died in 1595 and was buried in the church of St Mary Magdalene.  His second wife had a son called Thomas Moone.

References

Year of birth missing
1623 deaths
English MPs 1621–1622
English merchants
People from Taunton